Bundesstraße 106 (abbreviated B 106) is a German federal highway in Mecklenburg-Vorpommern, begins at the B 105 in Wismar and ends at the B 321 in Schwerin.

History 

The road (Chaussee) between Wismar and Ludwigslust was built between 1830 and 1836. 
During the German Democratic Republic years the road was known as the Fernverkehrsstraße 106 (long distance route 106) (abbreviation F106) .

Due to the Bundesautobahn 14 running directly parallel, the southern part of the road between Schwerin and Ludwigslust was downgraded to a Landesstraße (L72) starting in 2016.

Route / Junctions

References 

106
B 106